Władysław Marcjan Mikołaj Żeleński (6 July 1837 – 23 January 1921) was a Polish composer, pianist and organist.

Life
Żeleński was born in Grodkowice.  He was a representative of neoromanticism in Polish music. Since early days Żeleński showed interest in chamber music. While in secondary school, he wrote two quartets and a trio that, however, have not survived to our times. Later chamber pieces include: Sextet in C major, Op. 9 and Wariacje na temat własny (Variations on an Original Theme) for string quartet, Op. 29 Żeleński composed while studying first in Prague and later in Paris. He died in Kraków.

Władysław was the father of physician and writer Tadeusz Boy-Żeleński.

Notable works
Operas
 Goplana (1896)
 Janek
 Konrad Wallenrod (1895)
 Stara baśń

Symphonic compositions
 W Tatrach (In the Tatra Mountains), overture, Op. 27 (1870)
 Echa leśne (Forest Echos), overture
 Suita tańców polskich (Suite of Polish Dances), Op. 47
 Symfonie lesne (Spring Symphony), Op. 41
 Polonez koncertowy (Concert Polonaise)
 Trauerklänge, Elegisches Andante, Op. 36

Concertante
 Concerto E-flat major for piano and orchestra, Op. 60
 Romance for cello and orchestra, Op. 40

Chamber music
 Piano Quartet in C minor, Op. 61
 Piano Trio in E major for piano, violin, and cello, Op. 22 (1874, dedicated to pianist Augusta Auspitz-Kolar, published by Kahnt Verlag in Leipzig)
 Romance for violin and piano, Op. 16
 Sonata in F major for violin and piano, Op. 30 
 String Quartet in F major, Op. 28
 String Quartet in A major, Op. 42
 Wariacje na temat własny (Variations on an Original Theme) for string quartet, Op. 21 (1883)

Keyboard
 2 Mazurkas for piano, Op. 31 
 25 Preludes for organ, Op. 38
 Marsz uroczysty (Ceremonial March) for piano, Op. 44
 Rêverie for piano, Op. 48
 
Songs
Władysław is author of over 100 songs, most notable are:
 "Na Anioł Pański"
 "Słowiczku mój"
 "Zaczarowana królewna"

Discography
1998 : Organ Preludes – Acte Préalable AP0007 
2000 : Songs – Acte Préalable AP0291 
2005 : Violin Sonata – Acte Préalable AP0112 
2015 : Piano Works vol. 1 – Acte Préalable AP0124 
2011 : String Quartets – Acte Préalable AP0236 
2011 : Chamber Music – Acte Préalable AP0237 
2011 : Piano Works vol. 2 – Acte Préalable AP0238 
2012 : Complete Works for Violin – Acte Préalable AP0239 
2013 : Chamber Music with Piano – Acte Préalable AP0277 
2015 : Songs – Acte Préalable AP0318 
2016 : Secular Choral Works – Acte Préalable AP0363 
2017 : Secred Choral Works – Acte Préalable AP0374 
2017 : Songs, Duets – Acte Préalable AP0384 
2021 : Władysław Żeleński & Gustaw Roguski - Recently Discovered Works – Acte Préalable AP0480

See also
List of Poles

References

External links

 Scores by Władysław Żeleński in digital library Polona

1837 births
1921 deaths
19th-century classical composers
19th-century classical pianists
19th-century male musicians
19th-century musicians
20th-century classical composers
20th-century classical pianists
20th-century male musicians
Polish Romantic composers
Polish male classical composers
Polish opera composers
Polish classical pianists
Polish classical organists
Male classical pianists
Male classical organists
Academic staff of the Chopin University of Music
People from Wieliczka County